The Cry is a live album by soprano saxophonist Steve Lacy recorded at the AMR Jazz Festival in Geneva in 1998 and released on the Italian Soul Note label as a double CD in 1999.

Reception

Allmusic reviewer Tom Schulte stated "Saxophonist Lacy provides listeners with an engaging, lyrical selection of material. ... An entirely different face of Lacy, this is the man at his experimental best". All About Jazz noted "Although The Cry furthers the fascination soprano saxophonist Steve Lacy has previously established with setting the work of women writers to music, it also breaks significant new ground in its bold, uncompromising feminist political slant. In that single respect, The Cry could well prove to be as controversial as it is compelling".

Track listing
All compositions by Steve Lacy with text by Taslima Nasrin except where noted

Disc One:
 "Cannonade" – 1:39
 "Character" – 4:06
 "Straight Path" – 5:18
 "Granary" – 6:31
 "Divorce Letter" – 5:51
 "Divided" – 5:07
 "Agression" – 6:53
Disc Two:
 "Désir D'Amour" – 7:21
 "Body Theory" – 7:10
 "Dark and Handsome" – 6:27
 "Acquaintance" – 6:40
 "The Cry" – 11:56
 "Rundown (Ambapali Speaks)" (text by Ambapali) – 10:55

Personnel
Steve Lacy - soprano saxophone
Tina Wrase - soprano saxophone, sopranino saxophone, bass clarinet
Petia Kaufman – harpsichord
Cathrin Pfeifer – accordion
Jean-Jacques Avenel - bass
Daniel "Topo" Gioia – percussion
Irene Aebi - voice
Wanda Savy – scenery, lights
Pia Myrvold – dress

References

1999 live albums
Steve Lacy (saxophonist) live albums
Black Saint/Soul Note live albums